Lidiya Dancheva Nacheva (born 28 July 1993) is a Bulgarian footballer who plays as a midfielder. She has been a member of the Bulgaria women's national team.

References

1993 births
Living people
Women's association football midfielders
Bulgarian women's footballers
Bulgaria women's international footballers
Levante UD Femenino players
Bulgarian expatriate footballers
Bulgarian expatriate sportspeople in Spain
Expatriate women's footballers in Spain
FC NSA Sofia players